Cladognathus giraffa is a species of beetles of the family Lucanidae. It is also considered as Prosopocoilus girafa (Olivier, 1789). The body is flat and completely black, including the antler-like jaws and the legs. Males' jaws show several small teeth along inner edge and are slightly forked at the top. Larvae feed on rotten trunks of trees, while adults feed on saps tree juice. This species occurs from India to Indonesia. The preferred habitat is the tropical rain forests.

References

External links
 Thaibugs

Lucaninae
Beetles described in 1794